This is a list of commercial banks in Liberia.

Banks 
 Afriland First Bank Liberia
 AccessBank Liberia
 Ecobank Liberia
 G N Bank (Liberia)
 Guaranty Trust Bank Liberia
 Global Bank Liberia
 International Bank (Liberia)
 Liberian Bank for Development and Investment
 United Bank for Africa Liberia Limited

See also
 Central Bank of Liberia
 Economy of Liberia

References

External links
 Official Website of the Central Bank of Liberia
 List of Licensed Banks in Liberia

 
Banks
Liberia
Liberia